Yuan Yuan (born 11 January 1976) is a Chinese former swimmer who competed in the 1996 Summer Olympics.

During a routine customs check while travelling to the 1998 World Aquatics Championships in Perth, Australia, human growth hormone was found in her luggage, in sufficient quantities to supply the entire Chinese women's swimming team for the duration of the championships. Only Yuan was sanctioned for the incident, with speculation that this was connected to the nomination of Juan Antonio Samaranch by China for the Nobel Peace Prize in 1993.

References

1976 births
Living people
Chinese female breaststroke swimmers
Olympic swimmers of China
Swimmers at the 1996 Summer Olympics
Chinese sportspeople in doping cases
Doping cases in swimming
Asian Games medalists in swimming
Asian Games gold medalists for China
World Aquatics Championships medalists in swimming
Swimmers at the 1994 Asian Games
Medalists at the 1994 Asian Games
20th-century Chinese women
21st-century Chinese women